David Frank White (May 8, 1850 – December 31, 1897) was an American politician who served in the Virginia House of Delegates.

References

External links 

1850 births
1897 deaths
Democratic Party members of the Virginia House of Delegates
19th-century American politicians